Wojtek Czyz (born 30 July 1980) is a German Paralympic track and field athlete from Polish part of Silesia.

In 2001, he was an aspiring professional soccer player, and had just signed terms with SC Fortuna Köln. He ran for a loose ball, when the opposing goalkeeper rammed his knee, causing multiple fractures and compartment syndrome. According to Czyz, the injury was gravely underestimated due to professional failure. Due to delays in treatment, his leg had to be amputated. However, Czyz rebounded and established himself as one of the most successful German athletes in the T/F42 class for above-knee amputees.

Athletics success

Eleven months after his amputation, at the German Championships in 2002, Czyz broke the National record for F42 long jump and won the T42 100m event.

He won triple Gold Medals at the 2004 Paralympics. He won the 100 m and the 200 m dash the long jump for leg amputees, setting World Records in the latter two. In the European Championship of 2005, he repeated his triple crown, winning each discipline again. At the 2006 IPC Athletics World Championships he again won triple gold medals.

, Czyz is world record holder in the Men's F42 Long Jump event. He has  broken his own world mark several times. He beat his 2008 Paralympics record twice at the 2009 IWAS World Games, but wind assistance invalidated both jumps.

Personal life
, Czyz was a sport student in Cologne. His personal motto is "don't think of what you were, but of what you are and of what you aspire to be" ("denk nicht an das was du warst, sondern an das, was du bist und zu sein dich sehnst").
After his Sports career Wojtek Czyz sailed around the world together with his Wife Elena Brambilla to help amputees to get prosthetics for free and teach them how to walk. These two former professional Athletes funded sailing4handicaps. After the project Wojtek Czyz and Elena Brambilla set up a Manuka Honey company called  in New Zealand where they dedicate their passion for the nature.

See also
 The Mechanics of Running Blades

References

External links
  
 

1980 births
Living people
German male sprinters
German male long jumpers
German amputees
German people of Polish descent
Paralympic medalists in athletics (track and field)
Paralympic athletes of Germany
Paralympic gold medalists for Germany
Paralympic silver medalists for Germany
Paralympic bronze medalists for Germany
Athletes (track and field) at the 2004 Summer Paralympics
Athletes (track and field) at the 2008 Summer Paralympics
Athletes (track and field) at the 2012 Summer Paralympics
Medalists at the 2004 Summer Paralympics
Medalists at the 2008 Summer Paralympics
Medalists at the 2012 Summer Paralympics
World record holders in Paralympic athletics
People from Wodzisław Śląski